More More is a remix EP by Junkie XL, released digitally on November 20, 2007. The EP includes a variety of versions of "More", which features singer Lauren Rocket from Rocket.

The EP was released under the Artwerk label, a joint venture of EA and Nettwerk Music Group. It includes remixes by Tommie Sunshine, Tocadisco, D.I.M., Matthew Dekay and Kraak & Smaak. Even though the original song features explicit content, Tocadisco included a clean version of his remix.

Track listing
 More (Tocadisco Remix)
 More (Tocadisco Clean Remix)
 More (Tommie Sunshine's Degeneration Devastation)
 More (D.I.M. Pop Em All Dub Rework)
 More (Matthew Dekay Remix)
 More (Kraak & Smaak Let's Get Stupid Remix)

References

Junkie XL albums
2007 debut EPs